Sphacelariaceae is a family of algae belonging to the order Sphacelariales.

Genera:
 Battersia Reinke ex Batters, 1890
 Chaetopteris Kützing, 1843
 Herpodiscus G.R.South, 1974
 Onslowia
 Sphacelaria Lyngbye, 1818
 Sphacella Reinke, 1890
 Sphacelorbus Draisma, Prud'homme & H.Kawai, 2010

References

Brown algae
Brown algae families